Voxilaprevir is a hepatitis C virus (HCV) nonstructural (NS) protein 3/4A protease inhibitor (by Gilead) that is used in combination with sofosbuvir and velpatasvir. The combination has the trade name Vosevi and received a positive opinion from the European Committee for Medicinal Products for Human Use in June 2017.

On 18 July 2017, Vosevi was approved by the US Food and Drug Administration.

References

NS3/4A protease inhibitors
Tert-butyl compounds